Juma Kvaratskhelia (born 6 December 1969, in Gudauta) is a former football player from Abkhazia and the current trainer of the Abkhazian national team and Chairman of the Football Federation of Abkhazia. He last played for FC Zhemchuzhina-Sochi in the Russian First Division.

Career
In 2016, Kvaratskelia won the ConIFA World Football Cup as manager of the Abkhazian national football team.

President of the Football Federation of Abkhazia
On 24 January 2017, Ruslan Ajinjal resigned as Chairman of the Abkhazian Football Federation, and on 25 February, Kvaratskhelia was unanimously elected as his successor.

References

External links
 

1969 births
Living people
People from Gudauta
Footballers from Abkhazia
Soviet footballers
FC Taganrog players
PFC Spartak Nalchik players
FC Elista players
FC Zhemchuzhina Sochi players
Association football midfielders
FC Chita players